The White Mountain Grasslands Wildlife Area is a wildlife area in Apache County, Arizona. Located in the White Mountains, the wildlife area was established in 1999 and is approximately seven miles west of Springerville and the nearby town of Eagar.

See also
 Protected areas of the United States

References

Wildlife areas of Arizona
Protected areas of Apache County, Arizona
1999 establishments in Arizona
Protected areas established in 1999